A retaliatory arrest or retaliatory prosecution is an arrest or prosecution undertaken in retaliation for a person's exercise of their civil rights. It is a form of prosecutorial misconduct.

United States 

In Hartman v. Moore in 2006, the United States Supreme Court ruled that for a prosecution to be found retaliatory, it must have been brought without probable cause.

In the 2018 case of Lozman v. City of Riviera Beach, Riviera Beach, Florida argued that the logic of Hartman extended to retaliatory arrest. The Supreme Court issued a narrow ruling that plaintiff Fane Lozman was able to bring the claim despite there having been probable cause for his arrest. A year later, they answered the broader question, holding in Nieves v. Bartlett that probable cause defeats a claim of retaliatory arrest unless the plaintiff can show that others are typically not been arrested for similar conduct.

See also 

 Contempt of cop
 Arbitrary arrest and detention
 42 U.S.C. § 1983, governing claims against state actors for denial of constitutional rights
 Bivens v. Six Unknown Named Agents, governing claims against federal actors

References 

Political repression
Abuse of the legal system
Law enforcement terminology
Criminal law

Articles containing video clips